Scottish Crown can refer to:
 Crown (coin), see Scottish coinage
 Crown of Scotland, part of the Honours of Scotland, kept at Edinburgh Castle
 Scottish monarchy, see List of Scottish monarchs
 The Crown